Thomas John Davis (born c. 1901; date of death unknown) was an English footballer who played at centre-half for Port Vale and Stafford Rangers in the 1920s.

Early life
Thomas John Davis was born around 1900 or 1901, the eldest of three children to Mary Alice Talbot and Thomas Davis, and half-brother to nine siblings born to Mary Alice and her second husband Thomas Stevenson. His nephew, John Poole, would also become a professional footballer.

Career
Davis joined Port Vale in August 1923. He made his first-team debut in a 1–0 victory over Clapton Orient at The Old Recreation Ground on 10 November 1923. He moved on to Stafford Rangers, before becoming a committee member of the Stoke-on-Trent Electricity Sports Club.

Career statistics
Source:

References

1900s births
Year of death missing
People from Bucknall, Staffordshire
Footballers from Stoke-on-Trent
English footballers
Association football midfielders
Port Vale F.C. players
Stafford Rangers F.C. players
English Football League players